Hallerstein is a surname. Notable people with the surname include:
 Noble bavarian familie Haller von Hallerstein:
Carl Haller von Hallerstein (1774–1817), German architect, archaeologist and art historian
Ferdinand Augustin Hallerstein (1703–1774), Slovene Jesuit missionary in China

Other uses
15071 Hallerstein (1999 BN12) is a Main-belt Asteroid